The USBC Masters is a championship ten-pin bowling event conducted by the United States Bowling Congress. The Professional Bowlers Association (PBA) began recognizing it as a title event in 1998, and it was designated one of the four majors in 2000. A PBA rule change in 2008 retroactively awarded a PBA title (and a major) to any Masters winners prior to 1998 who were PBA members at the time of the victory.

History
The tournament began in 1951 as the ABC Masters, conducted by the American Bowling Congress (ABC). The ABC merged with the WIBC and YABA to become the USBC in 2005, after which the tournament was renamed USBC Masters. The Masters began as an invitational event showcasing national and local bowling stars and has grown to become one of bowling's most prestigious events.

While the event has evolved over the years, its trademark qualifying and double-elimination match play format has remained largely unchanged. All bowlers compete in 15 games of qualifying, with the top 63 qualifiers joining the previous year's champion in the double elimination match play bracket. (If the previous champion makes the top 63 or is unable to participate, the 64th-place qualifier is added.) All head-to-head matches consist of three games, highest total pinfall wins. First-time losers during the match play rounds are not eliminated, but are instead placed into an elimination bracket, where they must survive all subsequent three-game matches to have a chance at making the championship finals.

Hundreds of competitors turn out for the Masters each year (a full field of 360 entered the 2018 event) with their sights set on a prize fund that has recently been as high as $350,000, including a $50,000 top prize. The field, which now includes women, also features representatives from all 50 states and a handful of foreign countries.

The Masters is open to PBA members and any USBC member that meets average requirements. It is a part of the World Bowling Tour.

After the Masters in January 2004, the tournament was moved to the fall, resulting in two Masters events during calendar year 2004. (The first was part of the 2003–04 PBA season, and the second was part of the 2004–05 season.) Then in 2008, the tournament was moved back to the spring, which is why there was no Masters during 2008.

In 2007, Carolyn Dorin-Ballard became the first woman to bowl a perfect game in the USBC Masters.

Mike Aulby is the first player to have won the USBC Masters three times, but was eventually passed by Jason Belmonte. Belmonte is the only player to win three Masters in a row (2013, 2014 and 2015), and he won again in 2017 to become the only player to win four Masters titles. Prior to Belmonte's threepeat, the last player to successfully defend a Masters title was Billy Welu in 1964–65. The 1984 ABC Masters featured the 43rd and final PBA Tour title for Hall of Famer Earl Anthony. Walter Ray Williams Jr. is the oldest person to win the USBC Masters, capturing the 2010 event at age 50. In 2016, Anthony Simonsen, aged 19 years and 39 days, became the tournament's youngest winner, as well as the youngest to win a PBA major of any kind.

Current defending champion

2022 Event
The 2022 USBC Masters was held at the Gold Coast Hotel & Casino in Las Vegas, Nevada from March 31 to April 3. The tournament had a starting field of 420 bowlers, and used a five-player stepladder finals format.

On April 3, Anthony Simonsen won from the #2 seed position, defeating top seed Norm Duke in the final match, 219–216. This was Simonsen's tenth PBA Tour title, second USBC Masters title, and fourth major championship overall. Duke, 58, was seeking to become the oldest player to win a PBA Tour title as well as the oldest to win a PBA Tour major.

2022 Results
A five-player stepladder final round was used.

{{5TeamBracket-Stepladder
| RD1=Match #1
| RD2=Match #2
| RD3=Match #3
| RD4=Title match

| RD1-seed1=4
| RD1-team1=A. J. Johnson
| RD1-score1=189| RD1-seed2=5
| RD1-team2=Shawn Maldonado
| RD1-score2=143

| RD2-seed1=3| RD2-team1=Brad Miller| RD2-score1=224 (8, 9)| RD2-seed2=4
| RD2-team2=A. J. Johnson
| RD2-score2=224 (8, 7)

| RD3-seed1=2| RD3-team1=Anthony Simonsen| RD3-score1=189| RD3-seed2=3
| RD3-team2=Brad Miller
| RD3-score2=185

| RD4-seed1=1
| RD4-team1=Norm Duke
| RD4-score1=216
| RD4-seed2=2| RD4-team2=Anthony Simonsen| RD4-score2=219'}}

Prize Pool:
1. Anthony Simonsen (Las Vegas, Nevada) – $100,000
2. Norm Duke (Clermont, Florida) – $50,000
3. Brad Miller (Lee's Summit, Missouri) – $25,000
4. A. J. Johnson (Oswego, Illinois) – $15,000
5. Shawn Maldonado (Sugar Land, Texas) – $10,000

 Past champions 
2022 Anthony Simonsen
2021 Thomas Larsen
2020 not contested due to COVID-19 pandemic2019 Jakob Butturff
2018 Andrew Anderson
2017 Jason Belmonte
2016 Anthony Simonsen
2015 Jason Belmonte
2014 Jason Belmonte
2013 Jason Belmonte
2012 Mike Fagan
2011 Tom Hess
2010 Walter Ray Williams, Jr.
2009 John Nolen
2008 not contested due to PBA schedule change''
2007 Sean Rash
2006 Doug Kent
2005 Mike Scroggins
Oct. 2004 Danny Wiseman
Jan. 2004 Walter Ray Williams, Jr.
2003 Bryon Smith
2002 Brett Wolfe
2001 Parker Bohn III
2000 Mika Koivuniemi
1999 Brian Boghosian
1998 Mike Aulby
1997 Jason Queen
1996 Ernie Schlegel
1995 Mike Aulby
1994 Steve Fehr
1993 Norm Duke
1992 Ken Johnson
1991 Doug Kent
1990 Chris Warren
1989 Mike Aulby
1988 Del Ballard, Jr.
1987 Rick Steelsmith
1986 Mark Fahy
1985 Steve Wunderlich
1984 Earl Anthony
1983 Mike Lastowski
1982 Joe Berardi
1981 Randy Lightfoot
1980 Neil Burton
1979 Doug Myers
1978 Frank Ellenburg
1977 Earl Anthony
1976 Nelson Burton, Jr.
1975 Ed Ressler, Jr.
1974 Paul Colwell
1973 Dave Soutar
1972 Bill Beach
1971 Jim Godman
1970 Don Glover
1969 Jim Chestney
1968 Pete Tountas
1967 Lou Scalia
1966 Bob Strampe
1965 Billy Welu
1964 Billy Welu
1963 Harry Smith
1962 Billy Golembiewski
1961 Don Carter
1960 Billy Golembiewski
1959 Ray Bluth
1958 Tom Hennessey
1957 Dick Hoover
1956 Dick Hoover
1955 Buzz Fazio
1954 Eugene Elkins
1953 Rudy Habetler
1952 Willard Taylor
1951 Lee Jouglard

Note: In May 2008, the PBA announced it was revising its all-time records to include PBA-era ABC Masters championships prior to 1998 as PBA titles (and majors), if the champion was a PBA member at the time.

External links
 Official USBC Masters "Information" web page
 PBA.com site

References

Ten-pin bowling competitions in the United States